The Vela incident was an unidentified double flash of light detected by an American Vela Hotel satellite on 22 September 1979 near the South African territory of Prince Edward Islands in the Indian Ocean, roughly midway between Africa and Antarctica. Today, most independent researchers believe that the flash was caused by a nuclear explosion—an undeclared joint nuclear test carried out by South Africa and Israel.

The cause of the flash remains officially unknown, and some information about the event remains classified by the U.S. government. While it has been suggested that the signal could have been caused by a meteoroid hitting the satellite, the previous 41 double flashes detected by the Vela satellites were caused by nuclear weapons tests.

Detection 

The "double flash", then dubbed the South Atlantic flash, was detected on 22 September 1979, at 00:53 UTC, by the American Vela satellite OPS 6911 (also known as Vela 10 and Vela 5B), which carried various sensors designed to detect nuclear explosions that contravened the Partial Nuclear Test Ban Treaty. In addition to being able to detect gamma rays, X-rays, and neutrons, the satellite also contained two silicon solid-state bhangmeter sensors that could detect the dual light flashes associated with an atmospheric nuclear explosion: the initial brief, intense flash, followed by a second, longer flash.

Acoustic data of the Sound Surveillance System (SOSUS) established by United States to detect Soviet submarines and the Missile Impact Locating System (MILS) designed to detect missile nose cone impact locations of test missiles in the Atlantic and Pacific test ranges were searched in an effort to gain more knowledge on the possibility of a nuclear detonation in the region. These data were found not to have enough substantial evidence of a detonation of a nuclear weapon; however a detailed, affirming study regarding MILS data correlating with time and location of the Vela flash was not considered in that finding. United States Air Force (USAF) surveillance aircraft flew 25 sorties over that area of the Indian Ocean from 22 September to 29 October 1979 to carry out atmospheric sampling. Studies of wind patterns confirmed that fall-out from an explosion in the southern Indian Ocean could have been carried from there to southwestern Australia. It was reported that low levels of iodine-131 (a short-half-life product of nuclear fission) were detected in sheep in the southeastern Australian States of Victoria and Tasmania soon after the event. Sheep in New Zealand showed no such trace. The Arecibo Observatory in Puerto Rico detected an anomalous ionospheric wave during the morning of 22 September 1979, which moved from the southeast to the northwest, an event that had not been observed previously.

After the event was made public, the United States Department of Defense (DOD) clarified that it was either a bomb blast or a combination of natural phenomena, such as lightning, a meteor, or a glint from the Sun. The initial assessment by the United States National Security Council (NSC), with technical support by the Naval Research Laboratory in October 1979 was that the American intelligence community had "high confidence" that the event was a low-yield nuclear explosion, although no radioactive debris had been detected, and there were "no corroborating seismic or hydro-acoustic data". A later NSC report revised this position to "inconclusive" about whether a nuclear test had occurred. The report concluded that if a nuclear test had been carried out, responsibility should be ascribed to the South African weapons programme.

Office of Science and Technology evaluation 

The Carter Administration asked the Office of Science and Technology Policy (OSTP) to convene a panel of instrumentation experts to re-examine the Vela Hotel 6911 data, and to attempt to determine whether the optical flash detected came from a nuclear test. The outcome was politically important to Carter, as his presidency and 1980 re-election campaign prominently featured the themes of nuclear nonproliferation and disarmament. The SALT II treaty had been signed three months earlier, and was pending ratification by the United States Senate, and Israel and Egypt had signed the Camp David Accords six months earlier.

An independent panel of scientific and engineering experts was commissioned by Frank Press, who was the Science Advisor to president Carter and the chairman of the OSTP, to evaluate the evidence and determine the likelihood that the event was a nuclear detonation. The chairman of this science panel itself was Dr. Jack Ruina of the Massachusetts Institute of Technology, and also the former director of the U.S. Department of Defense's Advanced Research Projects Agency. Reporting in mid-1980, the panel noted that there were some key differences in the detected optical signature from that of an actual nuclear explosion, particularly in the ratio of intensities measured by the two detectors on the satellite. The now-declassified report contains details of the measurements made by the Vela Hotel satellite.

The explosion was picked up by a pair of sensors on only one of the several Vela satellites; other similar satellites were looking at different parts of the Earth, or weather conditions precluded them seeing the same event. The Vela satellites had previously detected 41 atmospheric tests—by countries such as France and the People's Republic of China—each of which was subsequently confirmed by other means, including testing for radioactive fallout. The absence of any such corroboration of a nuclear origin for the Vela incident also suggested that the "double flash" signal was a spurious "zoo" signal of unknown origin, possibly caused by the impact of a micrometeoroid. Such "zoo" signals which mimicked nuclear explosions had been received several times earlier.

Their report noted that the flash data contained "many of the features of signals from previously observed nuclear explosions", but that "careful examination reveals a significant deviation in the light signature of the 22 September event that throws doubt on the interpretation as a nuclear event". The best analysis that they could offer of the data suggested that, if the sensors were properly calibrated, any source of the "light flashes" were spurious "zoo events". Thus their final determination was that while they could not rule out that this signal was of nuclear origin, "based on our experience in related scientific assessments, it is our collective judgment that the September 22 signal was probably not from a nuclear explosion". The Ruina panel did not seriously consider a detailed study done by the Naval Research Laboratory concluding that the strong signals detected by three Ascension Island MILS hydrophones supported a near surface nuclear blast that could be associated with the observed double flash. The study used French testing in the Pacific as models and placed the site in the vicinity of the Prince Edward Islands.

Victor Gilinsky (former member of the Nuclear Regulatory Commission) argued that the science panel's findings were politically motivated. Some data seemed to confirm that a nuclear explosion was the source for the "double flash" signal. An "anomalous" traveling ionospheric disturbance was measured at the Arecibo Observatory in Puerto Rico at the same time, but many thousands of miles away in a different hemisphere of the Earth. A test in Western Australia conducted a few months later found some increased nuclear radiation levels. A detailed study done by New Zealand's National Radiation Laboratory found no evidence of excess radioactivity, and neither did a U.S. Government-funded nuclear laboratory. Los Alamos National Laboratory scientists who worked on the Vela Hotel program have professed their conviction that the Vela Hotel satellite's detectors worked properly.

Leonard Weiss, at the time Staff Director of the Senate Subcommittee on Energy and Nuclear Proliferation, has also raised concerns about the findings of the Ad-Hoc Panel, arguing that it was set up by the Carter administration to counter embarrassing and growing opinion that it was an Israeli nuclear test. Specific intelligence about the Israeli nuclear program was not shared with the panel whose report therefore produced the plausible deniability that the administration sought.

Possible responsible parties 

If a nuclear explosion did occur, it occurred within the 3,000-mile-wide (4,800 km diameter) circle covering parts of the Indian Ocean, the South Atlantic, the southern tip of Africa, and a small part of Antarctica.

Israel 

Well before the Vela incident, American intelligence agencies had made the assessment that Israel probably possessed its own nuclear weapons. According to journalist Seymour Hersh, the detection was the third joint Israeli-South African nuclear test in the Indian Ocean, and the Israelis had sent two IDF ships and "a contingent of Israeli military men and nuclear experts" for the test. Author Richard Rhodes also concludes the incident was an Israeli nuclear test, conducted in cooperation with South Africa, and that the United States administration deliberately obscured this fact in order to avoid complicating relations with South Africa and Israel. Likewise, Leonard Weiss offers a number of arguments to support the test being Israeli, and claims that successive U.S. administrations continue to cover up the test to divert unwanted attention that may portray its foreign policy in a bad light. Similarly, Professor Avner Cohen concluded that in hindsight, the existence of a cover-up by the United States is unambiguous because there were "at least three independent scientific pieces of evidence unrelated to a satellite that confirm the existence of the explosion."

In the 2008 book The Nuclear Express: A Political History of the Bomb and its Proliferation, Thomas C. Reed and Danny B. Stillman stated their opinion that the "double flash" was the result of a joint South African–Israeli nuclear bomb test. David Albright stated in his article about the "double flash" event in the Bulletin of the Atomic Scientists that "If the 1979 flash was caused by a test, most experts agree it was probably an Israeli test".
In 2010, it was revealed that, on 27 February 1980, President Jimmy Carter wrote in his diary, "We have a growing belief among our scientists that the Israelis did indeed conduct a nuclear test explosion in the ocean near the southern end of Africa."

Leonard Weiss, of the Center for International Security and Cooperation at Stanford University writes: "The weight of the evidence that the Vela event was an Israeli nuclear test assisted by South Africa appears overwhelming."

Reed has written that he believes the Vela incident was an Israeli neutron bomb test. The test would have gone undetected as the Israelis specifically chose a window of opportunity when, according to the published data, no active Vela satellites were observing the area. Although the decade-old Vela satellite that detected the blast was officially listed as "retired" by the U.S. government, it was still able to receive data. Additionally, the Israelis chose to set off the test during a typhoon. By 1984, according to Mordechai Vanunu, Israel was mass-producing neutron bombs.

South Africa 

The Republic of South Africa too had a clandestine nuclear weapons program at the time, and it falls within that geographic location. Nevertheless, the country had acceded to the Partial Test Ban Treaty in 1963 Later, concurrent with the end of apartheid, South Africa disclosed most but not all of the information on its nuclear weapons programme. According to international inspections and the ensuing International Atomic Energy Agency (IAEA) report, South Africa could not have constructed such a nuclear bomb until November 1979, two months after the "double flash" incident. Furthermore, the IAEA reported that all possible South African nuclear bombs had been accounted for. A Central Intelligence Agency (CIA) report dated 21 January 1980, that was produced for the United States Arms Control and Disarmament Agency, concluded that:

The United Nations Security Council Resolution 418 of 4 November 1977 introduced a mandatory arms embargo against South Africa, which also required all states to refrain from "any co-operation with South Africa in the manufacture and development of nuclear weapons".

Sasha Polakow-Suransky writes that, in 1979, South Africa was not yet advanced enough to test a nuclear device: "By the first week of October, the State Department had realized that South Africa was probably not the guilty party; Israel was a more likely candidate."

Soviet Union 

In 1979, the Defense Intelligence Agency (DIA) reported that the test might have been a Soviet test done in violation of the 1963 Partial Nuclear Test Ban Treaty (PTBT). Twenty years earlier in 1959, the USSR had conducted secret underwater tests in the Pacific in violation of the 1958 bilateral moratorium between the Soviet Union and the U.S. (cf. List of nuclear weapons tests of the Soviet Union) before the 1958 moratorium was unilaterally and officially abrogated by the Soviet Union in 1961.

India 

India had carried out a nuclear test in 1974 (codenamed Smiling Buddha). The possibility that India would test a weapon was considered, since it would be possible for the Indian Navy to operate in those waters so far south. This was dismissed as impractical and unnecessary as India had signed and ratified the Limited Test Ban Treaty (LTBT) in 1963, and had complied with it even in its first test, and that India was not hiding its nuclear weapons capability.

Pakistan 

An interagency intelligence memorandum requested by the United States National Security Council and entitled "The 22 September 1979 Event" analyzed the possibility of Pakistan wanting to prove its nuclear explosive technology in secret.

France 

Since the "double flash", if one existed, could have occurred not very far to the west of the French-owned Kerguelen Islands, it was a possibility that France was testing a small neutron bomb or other small tactical nuclear bomb.

Subsequent developments 

Since 1980, some small amounts of new information have emerged but most questions remain unanswered. A Los Alamos Scientific Laboratory report from 1981 notes:

In October 1984, a National Intelligence Estimate on the South African nuclear program noted:  A shorter form of this wording was used in a subsequent National Intelligence Council memorandum of September 1985.
In February 1994, Commodore Dieter Gerhardt, a convicted Soviet spy and the commander of South Africa's Simon's Town naval base at the time, talked about the incident upon his release from prison. He said:

Gerhardt further stated that no South African naval vessels had been involved, and that he had no first-hand knowledge of a nuclear test. In 1993, then President F. W. de Klerk admitted that South Africa had indeed possessed six assembled nuclear weapons, with a seventh in production, but that they had been dismantled (before the first all-race elections of April 1994). There was no mention specifically of the Vela incident or of Israeli cooperation in South Africa's nuclear program. On 20 April 1997, the Israeli daily newspaper Haaretz quoted the South African deputy foreign minister, Aziz Pahad, as supposedly confirming that the "double flash" from over the Indian Ocean was indeed from a South African nuclear test. Haaretz also cited past reports that Israel had purchased 550 tons of uranium from South Africa for its own nuclear plant in Dimona. In exchange, Israel allegedly supplied South Africa with nuclear weapons design information and nuclear materials to increase the power of nuclear warheads. Pahad's statement was confirmed by the United States embassy in Pretoria, South Africa, but Pahad's press secretary stated that Pahad had said only that "there was a strong rumor that a test had taken place, and that it should be investigated". In other words, he was merely repeating rumors that had been circulating for years. David Albright, commenting on the stir created by this press report, stated:

In October 1999, a white paper that was published by the U.S. Senate Republican Policy Committee in opposition to the Comprehensive Test Ban Treaty stated:

In 2003, Stansfield Turner, the Director of Central Intelligence (DCI) during the Carter administration, stated that the Vela detection was of a "man-made phenomenon". In his 2006 book On the Brink, the retired CIA clandestine service officer Tyler Drumheller wrote of his 1983–1988 tour-of-duty in South Africa:

In 2010, Jimmy Carter published his White House Diary. In the entry for 22 September 1979, he wrote "There was indication of a nuclear explosion in the region of South Africa—either South Africa, Israel using a ship at sea, or nothing." For 27 February 1980, he wrote "We have a growing belief among our scientists that the Israelis did indeed conduct a nuclear test explosion in the ocean near the southern end of Africa."

Some American information related to this incident has been declassified in the form of heavily redacted reports and memoranda following requests for records made under the US Freedom of Information Act; on 5 May 2006, many of these declassified documents were made available through the National Security Archive. A December 2016 report by William Burr and Avner Cohen of George Washington University's National Security Archive and Nuclear Proliferation International History Project noted that the debate over the South Atlantic flash has shifted over the last few years, on the side of a man-made weapon test. The National Security Archive briefing concluded:

The newly released research and subsequent report was largely based upon recently declassified documents in files at the National Archives of Gerard C. Smith, a former Ambassador and special envoy on nuclear nonproliferation during Jimmy Carter's presidency. Smith had once said: "I was never able to break free from the thought that the event was a joint operation between Israel and South Africa." The documents cited a June 1980 U.S. State Department report where DIA Vice Director Jack Varona had said the ensuing U.S. investigation was a "white wash, due to political considerations" based on "flimsy evidence". He added that the "weight of the evidence pointed towards a nuclear event" and cited hydroacoustic data analyzed by the Naval Research Laboratory. The data, he suggested, involved "signals... unique to nuclear shots in a maritime environment" and emanating from the area of "shallow waters between Prince Edward and Marion Islands, south-east of South Africa". Avner Cohen stated that "Now, 40 years later, there is a scientific and historical consensus that it was a nuclear test and that it had to be Israeli." In 2018, a new study made the case for the double flash being a nuclear test.

In popular culture 

 The West Wing episode "The Warfare of Genghis Khan" includes an element based on the Vela incident.
 In Metal Gear Solid V: The Phantom Pain, the Vela incident is mentioned in a tape recording and in the ending timeline.
 The NCIS: Los Angeles season 4 episode "Descent" references the Vela incident.

See also 

 Nuclear weapons and South Africa
 Nuclear weapons and Israel

Footnotes

References 

 
 
 
 
 
 
 
 

 
 
 
 
 
 
 
 
 
   Released by FOIA request, Frank Ruina, chair, 23 May 1980.

Further reading

External links
 Report on the 1979 Vela Incident 1 September 2001
 1979 South Atlantic "Flash" is Consistent with a Nuclear Explosion, According to Newly Declassified Energy Department Documents 1 March 2001
 Israeli Nuclear Weapons Testing
 Jeffrey Richelson (ed.), The Vela Incident Nuclear, Test or Meteoroid?, US National Security Archive, Electronic Briefing Book No. 190, 5 May 2006
 William Burr and Avner Cohen (eds.), The Vela Incident: South Atlantic Mystery Flash in September 1979 Raised Questions about Nuclear Test, National Security Archive, Electronic Briefing Book No. 570, 8 December 2016
 Avner Cohen and William Burr, Revisiting the 1979 VELA Mystery: A Report on a Critical Oral History Conference, Woodrow Wilson International Center for Scholars, 31 August 2020

1979 in South Africa
1979 controversies
1979 in international relations
September 1979 events in Africa
Suspected nuclear weapons testing
Israeli nuclear development
South Africa and weapons of mass destruction
Israel–South Africa relations
Nuclear proliferation
Cover-ups
Prince Edward Islands